In geometry, a valuation is a finitely additive function on a collection of admissible subsets of a fixed set  with values in an abelian semigroup. 
For example, the Lebesgue measure is a valuation on finite unions of convex bodies (that is, non-empty compact convex sets) of Euclidean space  Other examples of valuations  on finite unions of convex bodies are the surface area, the mean width, and the Euler characteristic.

In the geometric setting, often continuity (or smoothness) conditions are imposed on valuations, but there are also purely discrete facets of the theory. In fact, the concept of valuation has its origin in the dissection theory of polytopes and in particular Hilbert's third problem, which has grown into a rich theory, heavily reliant on advanced tools from abstract algebra.

Definition

If  then one always assumes

Examples
Some common examples for the admissible sets  are non-empty compact convex sets (convex bodies) in  compact convex polytopes in  convex cones, and smooth compact polyhedra in a smooth manifold 
  

 Any Lebesgue measure on  restricted to convex bodies, is a valuation on 
 Among the valuations derived from volume are the intrinsic volumes,

 The lattice point enumerator  where  is the integer lattice, is a valuation on lattice polytopes.
 The map  where 
 

Valuations on convex bodies

Let  be two convex bodies in  After a choice of Euclidean inner product, their Hausdorff distance  is defined by

where  denotes the -neighborhood of  Equipped with this metric,  is a locally compact space.

The space of continuous, translation-invariant valuations on  taking values in the complex numbers  is denoted by 

 
where  is a bounded subset with nonempty interior,  is a Banach space.

Homogeneous valuations
A translation-invariant continuous valuation  is said to be -homogeneous if 

for all  and  The subset  of -homogeneous valuations is a vector subspace of  McMullen's decomposition theorem states that

Valuations are not only graded by the degree of homogeneity, but also by the parity with respect to the reflection through the origin, namely
 
where   with  if and only if  for all convex bodies 

It is a simple fact that  is -dimensional and spanned by the Euler characteristic  that is, consists of the constant valuations on 

In 1957 Hadwiger proved that  (where ) coincides with the -dimensional space of Lebesgue measures on 

This in turn implies that an -homogeneous valuation is uniquely determined by its restrictions to all -dimensional subspaces.

Embedding theorems
The Klain embedding is a linear injection of  the space of even -homogeneous valuations, into the space of continuous sections of a canonical complex line bundle over the Grassmannian  of -dimensional linear subspaces of  Its construction is based on Hadwiger's characterization of -homogeneous valuations.
Hence

Theorem (Klain). The linear map  is injective.

A different injection, known as the Schneider embedding, exists for odd valuations. It is based on Schneider's description of simple valuations. It is a linear injection of  the space of odd -homogeneous valuations, into a certain quotient of the space of continuous sections of a line bundle over the partial flag manifold of cooriented pairs  Its definition is reminiscent of the Klain embedding, but more involved. Details can be found in.

The Goodey-Weil embedding is a linear injection of  into the space of distributions on the -fold product of the -dimensional sphere. It is nothing but the Schwartz kernel of a natural polarization that any  admits, namely as a functional on the -fold product of  the latter space of functions having the geometric meaning of differences of support functions of smooth convex bodies. For details, see.

Irreducibility Theorem
The classical theorems of Hadwiger, Schneider and McMullen give fairly explicit descriptions of valuations that are homogeneous of degree   and  But for degrees  very little was known before the turn of the 21st century. McMullen's conjecture is the statement that the valuations 

span a dense subspace of  McMullen's conjecture was confirmed by Alesker in a much stronger form, which became known as the Irreducibility Theorem:

Theorem (Alesker).

The proof of the Irreducibility Theorem is based on the embedding theorems of the previous section and Beilinson-Bernstein localization.

Smooth valuations

For every (complex-valued) smooth function  on 

Such a representation is sometimes called a Crofton formula.

For any (complex-valued) smooth differential form  that is invariant under all the translations  and every number  integration over the normal cycle defines a smooth valuation:

As a set, the normal cycle  consists of the outward unit normals to  The Irreducibility Theorem implies that every smooth valuation  is of this form.

Operations on translation-invariant valuations
There are several natural operations defined on the subspace of  smooth valuations  The most important one is the product of two smooth valuations. Together with pullback and pushforward, this operation extends to valuations on manifolds.

Exterior product
Let  be finite-dimensional real vector spaces. 
There exists a bilinear map, called the exterior product, 

which is uniquely characterized by the following two properties: 

Product
The product of two smooth valuations  is defined by 

where  is the diagonal embedding. The product is a continuous map 

Equipped with this product,  becomes a commutative associative graded algebra with the Euler characteristic as the multiplicative identity.

Alesker-Poincaré duality
By a theorem of Alesker, the restriction of the product 
 is a non-degenerate pairing. This motivates the definition of the -homogeneous generalized valuation, denoted  as  topologized with the weak topology. By the Alesker-Poincaré duality, there is a natural dense inclusion

Convolution
Define for fixed  with smooth boundary and strictly positive Gauss curvature 
 There is then a unique extension by continuity to a map 
 called the convolution.
Unlike the product, convolution respects the co-grading, namely if   then 

defines a smooth valuation of degree  The convolution two such valuations is

where  is a constant depending only on

Fourier transform
The Alesker-Fourier transform is a natural, -equivariant isomorphism of complex-valued valuations 
 discovered by Alesker and enjoying many properties resembling the classical Fourier transform, which explains its name.

It reverses the grading, namely  and intertwines the product and the convolution: 

Fixing for simplicity a Euclidean structure to identify   we have the identity  On even valuations, there is a simple description of the Fourier transform in terms of the Klain embedding:  In particular, even real-valued valuations remain real-valued after the Fourier transform.

For odd valuations, the description of the Fourier transform is substantially more involved. Unlike the even case, it is no longer of purely geometric nature. For instance, the space of real-valued odd valuations is not preserved.

Pullback and pushforward
Given a linear map  there are induced operations of pullback  and pushforward  The pullback is the simpler of the two, given by  It evidently preserves the parity and degree of homogeneity of a valuation.  
Note that the pullback does not preserve smoothness when  is not injective.

The pushforward is harder to define formally. For a surjective map  
 For an inclusion  choose a splitting  Then 

However, this identity has to be carefully interpreted since the pairing is only well-defined for smooth valuations. For further details, see.

Valuations on manifolds
In a series of papers beginning in 2006, Alesker laid down the foundations for a theory of valuations on manifolds that extends the theory of valuations on convex bodies. The key observation leading to this extension is that  via integration over the normal cycle, a smooth translation-invariant valuation may be evaluated on  sets  much more general than convex ones. Also suggests to define  smooth valuations in general by dropping the requirement that the form  be translation-invariant and by replacing the translation-invariant Lebesgue measure with an arbitrary smooth measure.

Let  be an n-dimensional smooth manifold and let  be the co-sphere bundle of  that is, the oriented projectivization of the cotangent bundle. 

For ease of presentation we henceforth assume that  is oriented, even though the concept of smooth valuations in fact does not depend on orientability.  The space of smooth valuations  on  consists of functions  of the form

where  and  can be arbitrary. 
It was shown by Alesker that the smooth valuations on open subsets of  form a soft sheaf over

Examples 
The following are examples of smooth valuations on a smooth manifold :
 Smooth measures on 
In particular,  is then the Chern-Gauss-Bonnet integrand, which is the Pfaffian of the Riemannian curvature tensor.
 If  is Riemannian, then the Lipschitz-Killing valuations or intrinsic volumes  are smooth valuations. The existence of these valuations is the essence of Weyl's tube formula.
 Let  be the complex projective space, and let  denote the Grassmannian of all complex projective subspaces of fixed dimension  The function 
This follows from the work of  Fu.

Filtration
The space  admits no natural grading in general, however it carries a canonical filtration 

The associated graded vector space  is canonically isomorphic to the space of smooth sections  where  denotes the vector bundle over  such that the fiber over a point  is  the space of -homogeneous smooth translation-invariant valuations on the tangent space

Product
The space  admits a natural product. This product is continuous, commutative, associative, compatible with the filtration:

and has the Euler characteristic as the identity element.

For example, if  is Riemannian, the Lipschitz-Killing valuations satisfy 

The Alesker-Poincaré duality still holds. For compact  it says that the pairing   is non-degenerate. As in the translation-invariant case, this duality can be used to define generalized valuations. Unlike the translation-invariant case, no good definition of continuous valuations exists for valuations on manifolds.

The product of valuations closely reflects the geometric operation of intersection of subsets.
Informally, consider the generalized valuation  The product is given by  Now one can obtain smooth valuations by averaging generalized valuations of the form  more precisely  is a smooth valuation if  is a sufficiently large measured family of diffeomorphisms. Then one has 

see.

Pullback and pushforward
Every smooth immersion  of smooth manifolds induces a pullback map  If  is an embedding, then 

The pullback is a morphism of filtered algebras.
Every smooth proper submersion  defines a pushforward map  by 
  The pushforward is compatible with the filtration as well: 
For general smooth maps, one can define pullback and pushforward for generalized valuations under some restrictions.

Applications in Integral Geometry
Formulas of this type are called kinematic formulas. Their existence in this generality was proved by Fu. For the three simply connected real space forms, that is, the sphere, Euclidean space, and hyperbolic space, they go back to Blaschke, Santaló, Chern, and  Federer.

Describing the kinematic formulas explicitly  is typically a  difficult problem. In fact already in the step from real to complex space forms, considerable difficulties arise and these have  only recently been resolved  by Bernig, Fu, and  Solanes.
 The key insight responsible for this progress is that the kinematic formulas contain the same information as the algebra of invariant valuations  
For a precise statement, let 
be the kinematic operator, that is, the map determined by the kinematic formulas. Let 

denote the Alesker-Poincaré duality, which is a linear isomorphism. Finally let  be the adjoint of the product map  The Fundamental theorem of algebraic integral geometry relating operations on valuations to integral geometry, states that if the Poincaré duality is used to identify  with  then :

.

See also

References

Bibliography

 
 
 
 

Geometry